The 1940–41 Hong Kong First Division League season was the 33rd since its establishment.

Overview
South China won the title.

Overview
South China won the championship.

References
RSSSF

Hong Kong First Division League seasons
Hong
First